Alpantuni is the name of an Instagram account posting comics depicting discrimination against LGBT in Indonesia. The titular character is attracted to other men and follows Islam. The comic did not show male genitals. It did portray, at times, two men in the same bed while not wearing shirts.

The account was created in November 2018. The amount of attention on it increased in February 2019. That month the Ministry of Communications (Indonesia) declared that the comics were pornography, and it stated that it had written a letter to Instagram, asking them to remove the comics. The comic account later disappeared. Instagram stated that it did not remove the account.

References

External links
 

LGBT in Indonesia
LGBT and Islam
Indonesian comics